Stephanotrypeta vittata is a species of tephritid or fruit flies in the genus Stephanotrypeta of the family Tephritidae.

Distribution
Saudi Arabia, Yemen, Kenya, Tanzania, Madagascar.

References

Tephritinae
Insects described in 1979
Diptera of Africa